Kim Un-ju (born 1989) is a North Korean weightlifter

Kim Un-ju may also refer to:

Kim Un-ju (footballer, born 1992)
Kim Un-ju (footballer, born 1993)
Go Joon-hee (born Kim Eun-ju, 1985), South Korean actress